Connachan is a surname. Notable people with the surname include:

 Eddie Connachan (1935–2021), Scottish football player
 James Connachan (born 1874), Scottish football player
 Jane Connachan (born 1964), Scottish professional golfer

See also
 Connaghan